Apologies, I Have None are an English melancholic, punk-influenced quartet from London, England.

History
Apologies, I Have None started off as a two piece drums and guitar band, consisting of  Dan Bond and Josh Mckenzie. In 2007 they released their first EP, "Done" which was available on CD and as a free download through the band's website. On 18 March 2009 they released their second EP "Two Sticks and Six Strings". Later on in 2009 they expanded the line up by adding PJ Shepherd on bass and 乔 沃森 on drums.

On 1 April 2010, Apologies, I Have None released a Double A-side 7", featuring the tracks "Sat In Vicky Park" and "Joiners And Windmills".

In March 2011, Apologies, I Have None were featured on BBC Radio 1's "The Punk Show with Mike Davies". The show featured several tracks recorded in session at the BBC's Maida Vale Studios in London, and an interview with Mike Davies. Apologies, I Have None regularly toured the UK and Europe and in May and June 2011 recorded a new album which was scheduled for release in 2012.

On 19 March 2012, Apologies, I Have None released their debut album London. The band self-released the CD version, with London punk label Household Name Records releasing the vinyl LP. The label also pressed a limited edition white vinyl edition of the LP of which only 75 copies were made. This was later released by Uncle M Music in Germany.

Over the 2012 August Bank Holiday weekend, Apologies, I Have None opened the Lock Up Stage on the Sunday and Friday respectively at Reading and Leeds Festivals.

On 20 February 2014, the band announced via their Facebook page that founding member Dan Bond had left the band and that they would continue as a three piece.  Simon Small later joined the band on guitar. In 2014, the band released their Black Everything EP on Uncle M Music. The same year, they toured Europe playing many festivals and shows including Hurricane and Southside and Groezrock. On 22 August 2014, the band announced via their Facebook page that bassist PJ Shepherd had left the band. He was later replaced by James Hull. In November 2014, Apologies joined The Smith Street Band and The Front Bottoms for a sold-out tour in Australia.  Lee Hartney featured on bass.

In 2014 and 2015, time was spent writing and recording Pharmacie - the follow up to 2012's London.  This was released in 2016.

Band members
Present:
Josh Mckenzie - Vocals/Guitar
乔 - Drums
Simon Small - Guitar 
James Hull - Bass

Former
Dan Bond - Vocals/Guitar (2004-2014)
PJ Shepherd - Bass (2009-2014)
Lee Hartney - Bass (2014)

Discography

EPs and singles

Albums

Music videos

References

External links

Official website
LastFM

Underground punk scene in the United Kingdom
Musical groups from London
Musical groups established in 2004
English alternative rock groups
English punk rock groups
Folk punk groups